Nils Jesper Alexander Salén (born 5 December 1978) is a Swedish physician and former actor.

Filmography
Om Stig Petrés hemlighet (TV) (2004)
Strandvaskaren (2004)
Ondskan (2003)
Festival (2001)
Naken (2000)
Vita lögner (TV) (1999)
En liten julsaga (1999)
Skärgårdsdoktorn (TV) (1998)
Pappas flicka (TV) (1997)
Skilda världar (TV) (1997)
Skuggornas hus (TV) (1996)
Chewing Gum (1996)
Pensionat Oskar (1995)
Kådisbellan (1993)

References

External links

Swedish male actors
1978 births
Living people
21st-century Swedish physicians
People from Lidingö Municipality
Karolinska Institute alumni